Sassoumbroum is a village and rural commune in the Magaria Department of the Zinder Region of Niger.

References

Communes of Niger
Zinder Region